"Labour of Love" is a song by Scottish duo Hue and Cry, released in 1987 as the second single from their debut album, Seduced and Abandoned. It peaked at number 6 in the UK Singles Chart.

In 1993, the song was remixed by house music producer/DJ Joey Negro and released as a single that reached number 25 in Britain.

"Labour of Love" was featured on the soundtrack for the video game Grand Theft Auto: Episodes from Liberty City.

Personnel
Pat Kane: lead vocals and backing vocals
Greg Kane: electronic piano
Nigel Clark: electric guitar
James Finnigan: bass
Tony McCracken: drums
David Preston: backing vocals
Robert Purse: bongos

References

1987 songs
1987 singles
Hue and Cry songs